Telipna acraea, the common telipna, is a butterfly in the family Lycaenidae. It is found in Sierra Leone, Liberia, Ivory Coast, Ghana, Togo, Nigeria, Cameroon, the Central African Republic and the Democratic Republic of the Congo. The habitat consists of forests.

Subspecies
Telipna acraea acraea (Sierra Leone, Liberia, Ivory Coast, Ghana, Togo, Nigeria, western Cameroon)
Telipna acraea fervida (Grose-Smith & Kirby, 1890) (Nigeria, Cameroon)
Telipna acraea nigrita Talbot, 1935 (Central African Republic, Democratic Republic of the Congo)

References

Butterflies described in 1851
Poritiinae